Rebeca Gusmão (born August 24, 1984) is a former freestyle swimmer from Brazil. She won the bronze medal in the women's 4×100 m freestyle relay at the Pan American Games in Santo Domingo, Dominican Republic. She also participated at the 2004 Olympics and the 2007 Pan American Games.

Gusmão won the women's 50 and 100 freestyle events at the 2007 Pan Ams; however, all her results (times and placings) from those Games were later nullified due to a positive doping-control test. Her medals were also revoked.

Doping sanction/banning
There are 3 testing groups that are relevant to Rebeca Gusmão's doping sanctions:
an in-competition test from May 25–26, 2006,
an out-of-competition test on July 13, 2007, and
the in-competition tests from the 2007 Pan American Games.

Basically, the 2006 test and the out-of-competition test were positive for testosterone; the in-competition tests showed signs of tampering.

On November 5, 2007, Rebeca Gusmão received a provisionally suspension by FINA, the International Swimming Federation, for a positive out-of-competition doping control result for testosterone taken on July 13, 2007. With this, she was temporarily barred from competition (effective November 2, 2007), until a hearing could be held before the FINA Doping Panel.

On December 13, 2007, PASO declared Rebeca Gusmão guilty of doping with testosterone and revoked her XV Pan American Games medals. Her times from the 2007 Pan American Games were also nullified.

On May 16, 2008, the FINA Doping Panel declared Gusmão ineligible for 2 years (beginning November 2, 2007) for the out-of-competition result.

On July 28, 2008, the FINA Doping Panel declared Gusmão ineligible for 2 years (beginning July 17, 2008) for the May 2006 test which contained testosterone. With this decision, all results from May 25, 2006 forward were nullified.

Then September 3, 2008, the FINA Doping Panel banned Gusmão for life ("ineligible for lifetime") due to tampering. All results from July 18, 2007 and forward were (again) annulled.

The full FINA Doping Panel decision from September 3, 2008 can be found online here.

See also
List of South American records in swimming
List of Brazilian records in swimming
List of doping cases in sport

References

UOL Profile (with photo) 
Information about the testosterone affair (with photo) 
Gusmão's defense (with photos) 
Loss of XV Pan American Games medals 
Definitive prohibition in competitions 

1984 births
Living people
Brazilian female freestyle swimmers
Sportspeople from Brasília
Olympic swimmers of Brazil
Swimmers at the 1999 Pan American Games
Swimmers at the 2003 Pan American Games
Swimmers at the 2004 Summer Olympics
Brazilian sportspeople in doping cases
Doping cases in swimming
Pan American Games bronze medalists for Brazil
Pan American Games medalists in swimming
The Farm (TV series) contestants
Medalists at the 1999 Pan American Games
Medalists at the 2003 Pan American Games
20th-century Brazilian women
21st-century Brazilian women